The Hasselborg Lake North Shelter Cabin is a historic backcountry shelter in the Admiralty Island National Monument, part of Tongass National Forest in Southeast Alaska.  The three-sided Adirondack-style log cabin, of which at best ruins survive today, was built in 1935 by a Civilian Conservation Corps work crew as part of a canoe route across the island.  It is located at the northeast corner of Hasselborg Lake, where a poorly maintained or abandoned trail leads north to Windfall Harbor.

The cabin site was listed on the National Register of Historic Places in 1995.  At that time the cabin site had been flooded due to beaver activity, and its roof was failing due to an extended period of poor maintenance.

See also
 National Register of Historic Places listings in Hoonah-Angoon Census Area, Alaska

References

1935 establishments in Alaska
Buildings and structures completed in 1935
Civilian Conservation Corps in Alaska
Log cabins in the United States
Buildings and structures on the National Register of Historic Places in Hoonah–Angoon Census Area, Alaska
Park buildings and structures on the National Register of Historic Places in Alaska
Tongass National Forest
Log buildings and structures on the National Register of Historic Places in Alaska